is a Japanese football player who plays as Forward and currently play for Júbilo Iwata.

Career
After graduation at Ryutsu Keizai University in 2017, Ryo Germain joined J1 League club, Vegalta Sendai in 2017.

Ryo Germain joined J1 League club, Yokohama FC in 2021.

Ryo Germain joined newly promoted J1 League club, Júbilo Iwata in 2022.

Personal life
Ryo Germain was born in Atsugi, Kanagawa due to American father and Japanese mother.

Career statistics

Club
Updated to the 5 March 2023.

References

External links
Profile at Vegalta Sendai
Profile at Yokohama FC
Profile at Jubilo Iwata

1995 births
Living people
Ryutsu Keizai University alumni
People from Atsugi, Kanagawa
Association football people from Kanagawa Prefecture
Japanese footballers
Japanese people of American descent
J1 League players
J2 League players
Vegalta Sendai players
Yokohama FC players
Júbilo Iwata players
Association football forwards
Universiade gold medalists for Japan
Universiade medalists in football